HMS Valeur was a 28-gun sixth-rate frigate of the Royal Navy, initially launched in 1754 as the Valeur for the French Navy, and classified by them as a corvette. The British captured her in 1759. In Royal Navy service she captured several merchant vessels and privateers before she was sold in 1764.

Origins
Valeur was built between March 1754 and May 1755 at Rochefort to a design by François-Guillaume Clairin-Deslauriers. She was launched on 29 October 1754. Her career with the French Navy lasted five years.

Capture
She was serving in the Mediterranean when on 15 April 1759 , then a 14-gun sloop under the command of Commander Timothy Edwards, serving with a British squadron under Edward Boscawen, engaged her and forced her to surrender. The previous day Favourite and  had captured a French merchant vessel sailing from Martinique. The next day the two British vessels saw and gave chase to two more French vessels. Favourite was able to catch up with one of them when the wind failed and she could use her oars. After an engagement that lasted some two-and-a-half hours at the onset of which Edwards had succeeded in wrong-footing Valeur, Valeur surrendered. When the engagement ended Favorite had only two rounds and a half of powder left, having fired 50 broadsides.

Valeur had twenty 9-pounder guns, four 12-pounder guns, and a crew of 110 men. Favourite had only sixteen 6-pounder guns and four 3-pounder guns, though she too had a nominal crew of 110 men. In the engagement, Valeur had 13 men killed and 9 wounded; Favourite suffered extensive damage to her hull, masts, yards and rigging, but had only seven men wounded. Valeur was carrying a valuable cargo of sugar, coffee and indigo.

Royal Navy career
The Admiralty purchased Valeur at Gibraltar on 13 December 1759. The Royal Navy commissioned her as a post-ship and Boscawen awarded command of her to Edwards (and promotion to post-captain in recognition of his feat in capturing a better-armed vessel than his own. Edwards apparently took command in August 1759. While under Edward's command Valeur captured the privateer Heureux Retour on 5 July 1760. Heureux Retour, of Marseilles, was armed with eight guns and had a crew of 56 men.

Also in 1760, Valeur captured two Genoese merchant ships. One, sailing from Marseilles to St. Domingo, she took into Gibraltar. The other, sailing to Martinique, she took into Barcelona.

In January–February 1761, Edwards took a British consul to Algiers to demand restitution from the Dey of Algiers for the plundering of the Mary which had been traveling from Lancaster to Gambia when she had encountered an Algerine privateer off Cape Finisterre.

Captain Robert Lambert took over command in 1761. In 1762 Valeur captured several vessels in the Mediterranean:
pinque Esperance (5 March);
pinque Ste. Famille (19 April);
tartane St. Joseph (22 April);
settee Sto.
xebec St. Joseph, a privateer (28 September).

Fate
Lambert paid off Valeur in October 1763 and she was surveyed on 3 October 1763. She was then sold at Woolwich Dockyard on 26 January 1764 for £905.

Notes, citations, and references
Footnotes

Citations

References
 Beatson, Robert (1790) Naval and military memoirs of Great Britain: from the year 1727, to the present time ... (Edinburgh: J. Strachan ..., and P. Hill).
 Beatson, Robert (1804) Naval and military memoirs of Great Britain, from 1727 to 1783, Volume 2 (Longman, Hurst, Rees and Orme).
 Campbell, John (1820) Naval history of Great Britain: including the history and lives of the British admirals. Volume 8 (Baldwyn and Co.)
 
 Dobson, John (1763) Chronological annals of the War; from its beginning [in 1755] to the present time. (Clarendon Press).
 Duncan, Archibald (1805%) The British trident, or, Register of naval actions: including authentic accounts of all the most remarkable engagements of sea in which the British flag has been distinguished from the ... defeat of the Spanish Armada to the present time ....  (J. Cundee).
 

1754 ships
Sixth-rate frigates of the Royal Navy